A Suntiang is an elaborate crown worn normally by Minangkabau women in Sumatra for festive occasions. It has the shape of a radiant fan and is made out of golden materials such as brass and copper.

A piece worn by a bride (referred to as Anak Daro) for a wedding is called Suntiang Gadang, while the one worn by traditional dancers is called pasumandan. The suntiang is worn at the wedding party, and is quite heavy, weighing up to 3.5 kilograms.

The headpiece's weight is meant to symbolize the burdens that may arise after marriage, like motherhood and furthering the bride's marriage. In the bride wearing the ornament, the message is conveyed that she can carry the weight of a relationship.

References

External links 
 http://www.creative-museum.com/en/content/minangkabau-crown-bride-sumatra-6
 Image gallery of various Suntiang

Crowns (headgear)
Minangkabau